Angela Kincaid, formerly known by her married name of Angela Mills, is a children's book illustrator best known for The Butterfly Children series of picture books. In 1983, with her then husband, Pat Mills, she created the Celtic comics character Sláine for 2000 AD.

External links
2000 AD profile

British illustrators
Living people
Year of birth missing (living people)